Miro Teixeira (born May 27, 1945) is a Brazilian lawyer, politician and journalist.

Background
Teixeira graduated in Law at the Candido Mendes University. He operates from a political base in Rio de Janeiro.

Political career
He began his career with the Brazilian Democratic Movement (Movimento Democrático Brasileiro), an opposition party to the military regime. At the start of the 1980s, together with Tancredo Neves he helped in the founding of the Partido Popular in a centrist initiative to balance the Brazil political landscape. Afterwards, he allied himself with Leonel Brizola and entered the Democratic Labour Party (PDT) where he remained for two decades. In 1996 he was a candidate for the local district of Rio and achieved fourth place.

In 2002, he supported Luiz Inácio Lula da Silva in the Brazilian Presidential election and was nominated to be Minister of Communications.  During his term as minister, he broke with PDT and entered the Workers' Party. In 2004 he was relieved of his position by Lula and assumed the mandate of a federal deputy in the Brazilian House. In 2013 he was listed as a member in the party of former senator and 2010 and 2014 presidential candidate Marina Silva, Sustainability Network (REDE).

References

1945 births
Living people
Universidade Candido Mendes alumni
20th-century Brazilian lawyers
Brazilian Democratic Movement politicians
Democratic Labour Party (Brazil) politicians
Workers' Party (Brazil) politicians
Cidadania politicians
Progressistas politicians
Sustainability Network politicians
Republican Party of the Social Order politicians
Members of the Chamber of Deputies (Brazil) from Rio de Janeiro (state)
Government ministers of Brazil